Manfred Becker (born March 10, 1960) is a German-Canadian documentary independent filmmaker and film editor. His work often explores personal stories behind current or historical issues.

Born and raised in Wilhelmshaven, Germany, Becker moved to Canada in 1983. Since 2001, Becker has been writing and directing documentaries for television, his latest, a look at the phenomenon of tourists seeking out places of conflict and fear entitled Dark Tourism, being the eighth. In the past decade Becker has written and directed eight documentaries for television, earning him numerous nominations and awards.  His film Fatherland won the Donald Brittain Gemini Award in 2006 for Best Documentary and was screened at Hot Docs and several other festivals internationally.

Awards
Becker has edited feature-length documentaries for Canadian filmmakers Sturla Gunnarsson, Nettie Wild and Paul Jay that have won Gemini, Genie and Chalmers awards and an International Emmy among others. In addition to a Gemini award for Best Editing on Hitman Hart: Wrestling with Shadows (1999), Becker's work on Thin Ice (2000) was nominated for the same category. Becker's work on A Place Called Chiapas led to a Hot Docs award.

Personal life
Becker is married to Susan Meggs, whom he met at a screening in Toronto, where the couple currently reside. They have two children, Jonas and Sebastian, aged 21 and 19.

Filmography
 Death of a Warrior (2001). A documentary about the bombing of the Greenpeace vessel "Rainbow Warrior". For History Television
 Neighbours (2003) A Historical documentary about the crossing paths of Sigmund Freud and Adolf Hitler in a fin-de-siecle Vienna. For History Television
 The Life of Me (2003) A vérité documentary following the workshop of a play for the "Madness in the Arts Festival" featuring actors with mental illness. For TVOntario
 The Siege (2004) Historical documentary on the 1999 siege of a UN compound in East Timor. For History Television
 Fatherland (2004) Feature-length personal essay documentary on history, memory and fatherhood. For History Television
 Hitler's Children: Germany in Autumn 1977 (2006). For History Television
 Diamond Road (2007) 3x one-hour HD documentary series on the global diamond industry. For Discovery Times & DISCOVERY HD, ARTE, ZDF, NHK, Australian and French TV
 Dark Tourism (2008) Vérité documentary on the phenomenon of tourists seeking out places of conflict and fear. For History Television
 Here At Home (2012) Becker is the Toronto director for the National Film Board of Canada web documentary Here At Home, exploring the Mental Health Commission of Canada's efforts to end homelessness for people with mental illness via its At Home initiative.

References

External links
 Official website
 

1960 births
Living people
Canadian documentary film directors
People from Wilhelmshaven
Film directors from Toronto
West German emigrants to Canada
Canadian Screen Award winners